San Juan de Nicaragua Airport (Spanish: Aeropuerto de San Juan de Nicaragua)  is an airport located in San Juan de Nicaragua, Río San Juan, Nicaragua. The airport was built in 2012 at a cost of almost US$17 million.

Airlines and destinations

See also

 Transport in Nicaragua
 List of airports in Nicaragua

References

External links
OpenStreetMap - San Juan de Nicaragua Airport
EAAI - San Juan de Nicaragua Airport

Airports in Nicaragua
Río San Juan Department